Christian M. Ringle is a professor of management at the Hamburg University of Technology, Germany. He is one of the co-founders and co-developers of SmartPLS, a Java-based software package for composite-based structural equation modeling using the partial least squares path modeling method. Since 2018, Christian Ringle has been included in the Clarivate Analytics' highly cited researchers list.

References 

Living people
Academic staff of the Hamburg University of Technology
University of Hamburg alumni
Year of birth missing (living people)